The Murhof Legends – Austrian Senior Open is a men's senior (over 50) professional golf tournament on the European Senior Tour. It was held for the first time in September 2019 at Golfclub Murhof, Frohnleiten, Austria and was the first European Senior Tour event to be held in Austria. Prize money was €250,000.

Winners

References

External links
Coverage on the European Senior Tour's official site

European Senior Tour events
Golf tournaments in Austria
Recurring sporting events established in 2019
2019 establishments in Austria